Idaho has produced a number of musicians and bands, including Paul Revere & the Raiders, Built to Spill, Treepeople, and Caustic Resin. Rosalie Sorrels is a renowned folk singer born in Boise. Minimalist composer La Monte Young was born in Bern. Jazz double bassist Gary Peacock was born in Burley. Nikki Sixx (bassist of glam metal band Mötley Crüe) grew up in Jerome. Moscow, Idaho is the home town of modern folk/country/indie songwriter Josh Ritter.

The town of Weiser has held fiddling contests since the 1890s, when the instrument arrived in Idaho on the Oregon Trail. Since the early 1950s, Weiser has been home to the National Oldtime Fiddlers' Contest, held in June and hosting more than 20,000 people a year. The late Kevin Sharp who had a hit song with "Nobody Knows but Me" lived in Weiser, Idaho and then moved to Los Angeles. Idaho is also home to the National Oldtime Fiddlers' Hall of Fame.

Music venues and institutions
There is an Idaho Symphony Orchestra, Idaho Falls Symphony Orchestra, Coeur d'Alene Symphony Orchestra (founded in 1981), Idaho State Civic Symphony, Magic Valley Symphony and a Washington Idaho Symphony. The Idaho State Civic Symphony is the oldest in the state, having been founded in the early 1900s. The Treefort Music Fest, founded in 2014, many independent bands from the area, in addition to attracting established acts from outside Boise.

Notably, every year the University of Idaho holds the annual Lionel Hampton International Jazz Festival, in which schools from all over the world, as well as famous musicians, come to celebrate Jazz as an art form. A similar event is held at Boise State University, called the Gene Harris Jazz Festival.

Major music venues include the L.E. and Thelma E. Stephens Performing Arts Center at Idaho State University in Pocatello.

Small and large venues exist throughout downtown Boise, though the former consists of mostly bars and coffee shops, and the larger remain concert halls and arenas. Perhaps the most popular concert house is the Knitting Factory (formerly the Big Easy), as well as The Olympic, which caters to the alternative, indie, and metal music. Although many famous artists and musicians play in Boise, many acts pass up Boise in favor of venues in Salt Lake City, Seattle, or Portland, Oregon.

Idaho Falls is home to a small number of venues.

Rexburg, Idaho also has a budding local music scene, with many of the bands being formed by students at Brigham Young University–Idaho.

Indigenous music

References

External links
 Idaho Music Educators Association
 Idaho Music Teachers Association

 
Idaho culture
Idaho